Kotovo is a town and the administrative center of Kotovsky District in Volgograd Oblast, Russia, located on the Little Kazanka River (Don's tributary),  north of Volgograd, the administrative center of the oblast. Population:

History
It was founded in the 1710s and was granted town status in 1966.

Administrative and municipal status
Within the framework of administrative divisions, Kotovo serves as the administrative center of Kotovsky District. As an administrative division, it is incorporated within Kotovsky District as the town of district significance of Kotovo. As a municipal division, the town of district significance of Kotovo is incorporated within Kotovsky Municipal District as Kotovo Urban Settlement.

References

Notes

Sources

Cities and towns in Volgograd Oblast
Kamyshinsky Uyezd